Simontsevo is a rural locality (a village) in Saryevskoye Rural Settlement, Vyaznikovsky District, Vladimir Oblast, Russia. The population was 138 as of 2010. There are 2 streets.

Geography 
Simontsevo is located 24 km west of Vyazniki (the district's administrative centre) by road. Vyazovka is the nearest rural locality.

References 

Rural localities in Vyaznikovsky District